Max Dauphin was born 1977 in Luxembourg. After years of international activity, the artist settled in Luxembourg where he works and lives. He is part of the Bamhaus Art Collective. On several occasions, Max Dauphin participated to Luxembourg Art Week.

Max Dauphin creates figurative art works, using mixed techniques and big formats.  His paintings frequently reveal scenes of life illustrated with slogans and/or iconography. His subjects are inspired by his experience, current events and more generally his entourage. Following daily conversations, the artist projects the viewer's attention toward captivating characters, sometimes living on the brink of society. By matching these characters with improbable attributes, their apparent realism gives way to the imagination. During his periples, Max Dauphin works with a deliberate challenge: to use a local palette of available materials. The combination of colors and material highlights the playfulness of his characters and emphasizes the dynamism of his subjects.

Like most children, his first contact with art took place while drawing with his father, a graphic designer, at the kitchen table. In the absence of his father, he continued to paint - a conversation prolonged throughout his career. During his studies in Marseille, France, Max Dauphin made contact with graffiti artists and dedicated himself to street art for a while. In parallel to his urban art-treks, he started showing his first paintings at the age of twenty-five.

In 2005, Max Dauphin participated in a group exhibition with an art work entitled Dongo the Vulture illustrating West African poetry at the French cultural center in Rome, Italy. The same year, he also exhibited a series of portraits at the Luxembourg Embassy in Italy.  In 2007, Max Dauphin opened a joint exhibition entitled Brush vs. Spray Can with graffiti artist Sumo at Konschthaus Beim Engel in Luxembourg.

Max Dauphin's first solo show No Names was shown in Kulturfoyer, Saarbrücken, Germany in 2009.  That year, the international competition Francophone games in Beirut, Lebanon, rewarded his painting Medusa's Raft with a special mention from the Jury.

While living in Central Asia, the artist exhibited City Spirits at the Tsagaandarium Gallery in Ulaanbaatar, Mongolia. 

During his time in the United States (2011-2013), Max Dauphin came up with an American collection. Original is not even a Flavor successfully premiered at Rockaway Beach Surf Club and was later shown on Lower East Side at ConArtist Gallery, today the Bowery Union Studio.

From 2014-2015 Max Dauphin worked in Dakar, Senegal, where he showed an African series of paintings Ana Wa Kër Gui?

Solo exhibitions
2021 Travelogues, Fellner Contemporary, Luxembourg 
2019 Inside Out. Stories from the collective unconscious, Neimënster, Luxembourg 
2018 I Died (Un)Happy In My Sleep The Farm, Luxembourg, Luxembourg 
2015 Ana Wa Kër Gui? Atelier Céramiques Almadies, Dakar, Senegal 
2013 Original is not even a Flavor ConArtist Gallery, New York, NY, USA 
2011 City Spirits Tsagaandarium Gallery, Ulaanbaatar, Mongolia 
2009 No Names Kulturfoyer, Saarbrücken, Germany 
2005 Portraits Ambassade du Luxembourg, Rome, Italy

Group exhibitions

2018 “Fëschmaart” Valerius Art Gallery, Luxembourg
2018 “Octopus”, Siren’s Call, Centre culturel de rencontre Abbaye de Neumünster, Luxembourg
2017 “Oh No”, Luxembourg Art Week, Luxembourg
2017 “Mermaid”, Siren’s Call, Centre culturel de rencontre Abbaye de Neumünster, Luxembourg
2016 "Mixed Media Xmas" Krome Gallery, Luxembourg
2016 "Nineveh" Luxembourg Art Week, Luxembourg
2016 "Transformation" Krome Gallery, Luxembourg
2015 "The Mongolia Project" Art Hub Gallery, London, UK
2009 Radeau de la Méduse Beirut, Lebanon
2007 Brush vs Spray Can Konschthaus Beim Engel, Luxembourg
2005 Dongo le Vautour Centre Culturel Français, Rome, Italy

Award
2009 Jeux de la Francophonie (Beirut, Lebanon) : Mention spéciale du Jury pour le Radeau de la Méduse

References

https://www.pressreader.com/luxembourg/luxemburger-wort/20190829/281986084224320
https://c.republicain-lorrain.fr/edition-de-longwy/2019/07/02/avec-inside-out-max-dauphin-nous-met-face-a-nos-demons
https://www.lequotidien.lu/culture/expo-inside-out-a-neimenster-un-sombre-regard/
http://delano.lu/d/detail/news/meaningful-death-art-conscious-consumption/197490#pid=1
https://www.journal.lu/top-navigation/article/verspielt-mit-botschaft/
http://www.saarbruecker-zeitung.de/aktionen/2009/72-stunden-aktion/saarbruecken/art29268,4035742
http://jeux.francophonie.org/-Portraits-d-artistes-.html?alpha=D

External links
https://www.bamhaus.lu/residents/max-dauphin/
https://www.neimenster.lu/en/Culture/Diversified-offer/Cultural-programming/Exhibitions/Inside-Out-Monday-24-June-2019-6-30-00-pm/
https://www.eventsinluxembourg.lu/de/node/91299/
http://krome-gallery.com/exhibitions/exhibition-38/
http://luxembourgartweek.lu/web/en/about/
http://www.wakhart.com/events/max-dauphin-expose/
http://www.tsagaandarium.org/image/tid/51/city-spirits-solo-exhibition-luxembourg-artist-max-dauphin

Luxembourgian painters
1977 births
Living people
People from Luxembourg City